Miles Zaharko (born April 30, 1957 in Mannville, Alberta) is a Canadian professional ice hockey player whose career lasted from 1977 to 1984. He played in the National Hockey League with the Atlanta Flames and Chicago Black Hawks.

Playing career
A native of Mannville, a small farming village in northern Alberta, Miles Zaharko was drafted as a defenceman by the Atlanta Flames in the second round, 20th overall, of the 1977 NHL amateur draft.

Miles Zaharko scored 5 goals and 32 assists in the 129 regular-season games in the National Hockey League which he played with the Flames and the Chicago Black Hawks.

Career statistics

Regular season and playoffs

External links
 

1957 births
Living people
Atlanta Flames draft picks
Atlanta Flames players
Canadian expatriate ice hockey players in the United States
Canadian ice hockey defencemen
Chicago Blackhawks players
Füchse Duisburg players
Ice hockey people from Alberta
New Brunswick Hawks players
New Westminster Bruins players
Nova Scotia Voyageurs players
Springfield Indians players
Tulsa Oilers (1964–1984) players
Winnipeg Jets (WHA) draft picks
World Hockey Association first round draft picks